The blue-capped fruit dove (Ptilinopus monacha) is a species of bird in the family Columbidae. It is endemic to the northern Maluku Islands.

Its natural habitats are subtropical or tropical moist lowland forests, subtropical or tropical mangrove forests, and rural gardens. It is threatened by habitat loss.

References

blue-capped fruit dove
Birds of the Maluku Islands
blue-capped fruit dove
Taxonomy articles created by Polbot